Turbinella laevigata, common name the Brazilian chank, is a species of very large sea snail with a gill and an operculum, a marine gastropod mollusk in the subfamily Turbinellinae of the family Turbinellidae.

Subspecies
There are two subspecies of this species: 
 Turbinella laevigata laevigata Anton, 1838
 Turbinella laevigata rianae Delsaerdt, 1986 (synonym : Turbinella rianae Delsaerdt, 1987)

Description 
The shell of this species is thick and heavy, and can grow as large as 200 mm in length.

Distribution
This species is found in Brazil.

Life cycle 
The spawn of Turbinella laevigata has 240 eggs in every capsule; each capsule contains a high number of nurse eggs.

Human use 
Turbinella laevigata is used as a zootherapeutical product. It is used as a treatment for sexual impotence in traditional Brazilian medicine in the northeast of Brazil.

References

External links
  Anton, H. E. (1838). Verzeichniss der Conchylien welche sich in der Sammlung von Herrmann Eduard Anton befinden. Herausgegeben von dem Besitzer. Halle: Anton. xvi + 110 pp.
 Kiener L.C. 1840-1841. Spécies général et iconographie des coquilles vivantes. Vol. 6. Famille des Canalifères. Deuxième partie. Genres Pyrule (Pyrula), Lamarck, pp. 1-34, pl. 1-15
 

 Malacolog info

Turbinellidae
Gastropods described in 1838